Abneet Bharti (born 14 July 1998) is an Indian professional footballer who plays as a centre-back for Liga Panameña de Fútbol side Club Deportivo del Este, on loan from Czech Fortuna Narodni liga club FK Varnsdorf.

Born in Kathmandu, Nepal, Bharti was called up to the India U23 national squad in 2015 but has never appeared with the team.

Playing career

Early career
Choosing football as part of his life, Bharti began his playing journey in goalkeeping position with his school team while his days in Nigeria. After end of his two-year school-football journey in the African country, he returned to India and represented the team of BGS International Public School in Delhi. He then started his youth football career in DSA Senior Division League outfit Shastri FC and emerged as top scorer in multiple tournaments. Bharti later earned a spot in Delhi's state youth team and was later called up to the national squad of the India U16 team. After spending two seasons, he moved abroad and attended trial for the Singaporean side Geylang International and broke into club's youth academy.

In 2014, he moved to Spain and joined youth academy of the LaLiga club Real Valladolid. While playing for the club, he received interest from the youth academies of German Bundesliga club Eintracht Frankfurt and Anderlecht in the Belgian top flight. He later enjoyed training cum trial stints at youth sides of Eintracht Frankfurt, TSV 1860 Munich, FSV Frankfurt and SV Darmstadt 98.

Senior career
In the midst of 2016–17 season, Bharti signed for then Portuguese League 3 team Sintrense after taking down the offer of joining Polish topflight club Podbeskidzie Bielsko-Biała. He made his debut against Sporting CP B and appeared in thirteen league games under coaching of Luís Boa Morte, who described him "a very fast and athletic defender, with confidence and technique on the ball". After being scouted by Mexican club América, his move to Liga MX in Apertura 2018 season, was not done due to a serious knee injury, which ruled him out of action for couple of months.

On 31 August 2019, Bharti returned to his home country signing with Indian Super League club Kerala Blasters. He joined the club after taking down his chance of appearing with América in the Mexican top flight. In July 2021, he signed for Czech Fortuna Národní Liga side Varnsdorf. With the Czech club, he made his debut in their 4–0 win over FK Neratovice–Byškovice. He appeared in two Pohár FAČR matches before facing the visa issues. Before kickoff of the 2022–23 season, Bharti was loaned out to BC Olimp Premier League club Talant Tash-Kömür on 8 March. He made his league debut on 11 March in their 1–1 draw against Dordoi Bishkek. After end of his short loan spell in the Kyrgyz club, he rejoined Varnsdorf in June. In March 2023, the club once again sent him on a loan spell as he joined Panamanian Liga de Fútbol club Deportivo del Este.

Personal life

Bharti is brother of Italian-born Indian footballer Aniket Bharti, who played for Polish club Znicz Pruszków and Colombian club Orsomarso.

Bharti revealed that he is supporter of Premier League club Arsenal.

Reception
In 2018, the Italian professional football magazine Calciomercato included him in the best eleven players from Asia under the age of twenty-one. Along with him, for example, Iranian forward Mohammad Sharifi, North Korean forward Kwang-Song Han or Chinese midfielder Jiahao Wang were selected.

See also
List of India international footballers born outside India
 List of Indian football players in foreign leagues

References

External links

Abneet Bharti at Sofascore

Abneet Bharti at FootballDatabase
 Abneet Bharti at PlaymakerStats

1998 births
Association football defenders
Expatriate footballers in Kyrgyzstan
Expatriate footballers in Nigeria
Expatriate footballers in Portugal
Expatriate footballers in Singapore
Expatriate footballers in Spain
Expatriate footballers in the Czech Republic
FK Varnsdorf players
Indian expatriate footballers
Indian expatriates in Nigeria
Indian expatriates in Portugal
Indian expatriates in Singapore
Indian expatriates in Spain
Indian footballers
Kerala Blasters FC players
Kyrgyz Premier League players
Living people
S.U. Sintrense players